The 1962–63 Chicago Black Hawks season was the Hawks' 37th season in the NHL, and the club was coming off a third-place finish for the fourth consecutive season in 1961–62, as Chicago won a team record 31 games and tied a club record with 75 points.  The Hawks would go on and upset the heavily favored Montreal Canadiens in the NHL semi-finals for the second straight season, however, the Black Hawks would lose to the Toronto Maple Leafs in the 1962 Stanley Cup Finals.

During the off-season, the Black Hawks and Toronto Maple Leafs reportedly came to agreement which would see the Hawks acquire Frank Mahovlich from Toronto for $1 million, however, the deal was nixed when Maple Leafs general manager Punch Imlach, on the advice from Conn Smythe, refused the deal, stating that $1 million does not score goals.

Chicago started the year off hovering around the .500 level through their first 12 games, as they had a record of 5–4–3.  Goaltender Glenn Hall, who had played an NHL record 502 consecutive games, injured his back early in November and suffered a pinch nerve, and was relieved by backup Denis DeJordy in a game against the Boston Bruins. Hall would miss the next game against the Montreal Canadiens, ending his streak, however, the Hawks won the game by a 3–1 score.  Hall would rebound from his injury, and the team would play very good hockey for the remainder of the season, winning a team record 32 games, and also setting a club record with 81 points, and finishing in second place in the NHL standings for the first time since they finished second in the American Division back in 1935.

Offensively, the Hawks were led by Stan Mikita, who led the team with 45 assists and 76 points, and tied Bobby Hull for the team lead in goals, with 31.  Hull added 31 assists to his goal total to finish second in team scoring with 62 points, while Ab McDonald set a career high with 61 points, as he scored 20 goals and added 41 assists.  On defense, Pierre Pilote led the way, scoring 8 goals and 26 points, along with superb defensive play, as he won the Norris Trophy.  Eric Nesterenko provided the team toughness, as he had a team high 103 penalty minutes.

In goal, Glenn Hall played the majority of the games, winning 30 of them, while posting an NHL best GAA of 2.47, and earning 5 shutouts.  Hall would win the Vezina Trophy, as Chicago had the fewest goals against during the season.

The Hawks would face the Detroit Red Wings in the NHL semi-finals, as Detroit finished fourth in the NHL with a record of 32–25–13, earning 77 points, and only 4 behind Chicago.  The series opened up at Chicago Stadium for the opening two games, and the Black Hawks took advantage, taking a 2–0 series lead a close 5–4 victory in the series opener, followed by a 5–2 win in the second game.  The series shifted to the Detroit Olympia for the next two games, and the Red Wings responded, defeating the Black Hawks 4–2 and 4–1 to even the series up.  Detroit continued their good play in the fifth game in Chicago, doubling the Hawks 4–2 to take a 3–2 series lead.  The sixth game was played back in Detroit, and the Red Wings had no problems closing the series out, easily beating the Black Hawks 7–4, as Chicago was eliminated in the NHL semi-finals for the first time since 1960.

Season standings

Record vs. opponents

Game log

Regular season

Detroit Red Wings 4, Chicago Black Hawks 2

Season stats

Scoring leaders

Goaltending

Playoff stats

Scoring leaders

Goaltending

References

Sources
Hockey-Reference
Rauzulu's Street
Goalies Archive
National Hockey League Guide & Record Book 2007

Chicago Blackhawks seasons
Chicago
Chicago